Alexandrovskoye is a rural locality (a selo) in Brasovsky District, Bryansk Oblast, Russia. Its population was 17 as of 2013. It has two streets.

Geography 
Alexandrovskoye is located 23 km north of Lokot (the district's administrative centre) by road. Pogreby is the nearest rural locality.

References 

Rural localities in Brasovsky District